Mediouna may refer to:

Mediouna, Algeria
Mediouna, Morocco